Victor "Vic" San Andres Ziga (September 30, 1945 – January 31, 2021) was a Filipino politician who served as senator in the 8th Congress. He was an assemblyman for Albay in the Regular Batasang Pambansa prior to getting elected as senator. He also served as Governor of Albay and cabinet minister in the Corazon Aquino administration.

Early life and career
Ziga was born on 30 September 1945 in Manila to parents Venancio Prieto Ziga, former governor and congressman of Albay, and Tecla San Andres Ziga, a former Senator and who was the first woman who topped number 1 in the Bar Examination in the Philippines.

Ziga studied in Ateneo de Naga, Ateneo de Manila University, the University of Santo Tomas and the University of California in Los Angeles (UCLA). He passed the bar in 1975.

Political career
Ziga ran in and won the 1984 Batasang Pambansa elections. He filed various bills such as the establishment of the National Rehabilitation Center for drug addicts, requiring secondary schools to teach avoiding drug addiction and abuse and increasing the minimum basic monthly salaries of public school teachers.

In 1986, he was appointed the Cabinet Minister of General Services. In 1987, he was elected as a Philippine Senator. He was the Chairman of the Public works and highways committee and a member of the Commission on Appointments, Senate Electoral Tribunal and 16 other committees.

Ziga's interest and concern for those who have less in life is reflected in his association and involvement in typhoon relief operations and civic organizations, such as the free Medical Eye Specialist Mission and the Medical Mission of the Philippine General Hospital.

In 1991, he joined the Magnificent 12 in rejecting the new proposed treaty for Subic Naval Base. Ziga eventually left politics and returned to the private sector as board director of San Miguel Corporation.

Personal life
Senator Ziga was married to Carmen Olbes Velasco with whom he had six children.

References

1945 births
2021 deaths
Senators of the 8th Congress of the Philippines
People from Albay
Bicolano politicians
Ateneo de Manila University alumni
University of Santo Tomas alumni
University of California, Los Angeles alumni
Members of the House of Representatives of the Philippines from Albay
20th-century Filipino lawyers
Liberal Party (Philippines) politicians
Members of the Batasang Pambansa
Corazon Aquino administration cabinet members